Tuek Chhu Falls is a waterfall in Kampot Province, Cambodia. It is noted for its bamboo platforms in which families sit to view the Kampot River. Tek Chhouu Zoo lies in the vicinity.

References

Waterfalls of Cambodia
Geography of Kampot province
Tourist attractions in Kampot province